The Continental Mark II is an ultra-luxury coupé that was sold by the Continental Division of Ford for the 1956 and 1957 model years.  The only product line ever marketed by Continental during its existence, the Mark II served as the worldwide flagship vehicle of Ford Motor Company.  The vehicle derived its name from European manufacturing practice, with "Mark II" denoting a second generation (succeeding the 1939–1948 Lincoln Continental).

As the most expensive American-produced automobile of the time, the Mark II was marketed against the Rolls-Royce Silver Cloud.  Produced solely as a two-door hardtop coupe, the Mark II used standard Lincoln mechanical components, including its "Y-block" V8 and automatic transmission.  The rest of the vehicle was largely hand-assembled, leading Ford to lose thousands of dollars for each example produced.

Following the 1957 model year, Ford discontinued its flagship Continental division, with the division phased into Lincoln from 1958.  For 1969, Ford revived the chronology of the Mark series with the debut of the (second) Continental Mark III coupe, leading to five successive generations; the model line currently ends with the 1998 Lincoln Mark VIII coupe.  In modified form, Lincoln still uses the four-point star emblem introduced by the Mark II; each version of the Mark series (and the 1982–1987 Lincoln Continental, as well as the 1977–1980 Lincoln Versailles) was styled with a "Continental" spare-tire trunklid.

The brand logo for Continental was a rectangular-framed four-pointed star. Following the withdrawal of the Mark II, Lincoln adopted the four-pointed star for 1958; modified slightly, the logo remains in use on Lincoln-brand vehicles today.

Background

For the 1949 model year, all three divisions of Ford Motor Company unveiled their first post-war product line, with Lincoln discontinuing the Lincoln Continental after six years of production (interrupted by World War II). Following World War II, the Lincoln and Mercury brands had been grouped together within a common division to streamline their operations. While the Lincoln Continental had gone on to build a positive reputation, the Continental was an aging design, as a variant of the 1936 Lincoln-Zephyr.

Following the withdrawal of the 1939–1948 Lincoln Continental, by the early 1950s, interest in a successor vehicle proved sufficient for Ford Motor Company to commence development on a successor. In 1952, the company formed the Special Product Operations team (later Special Products Division). Led by William Clay Ford, the team consisted of John Reinhart (chief stylist), Gordon Buehrig (chief body engineer; designer of the Cord 810), and Harley Copp (chief engineer).

Initially meeting with rejection from upper Ford management, in 1953, design work was approved to bring a successor to the Continental to production. The same year, the two-door luxury segment saw several American-produced vehicles enter production, with the launch of the limited-production Cadillac Eldorado, Buick Skylark, and Oldsmobile 98 Fiesta convertibles by General Motors (coinciding with the launch of the Chevrolet Corvette, as a sports car roadster), the Chrysler C-300 and the Packard Caribbean convertible.

Under William Clay Ford, the Special Products Division set out several objectives. In addition to creating a successor to the 1939–1948 Lincoln Continental, the Continental Mark II was also intended to revive the memory of the 1930s coachbuilt Lincoln Model K, among the flagship American automobiles of the time. In April 1955, the Continental Division was created by Ford Motor Company as a stand-alone division to handle the Continental Mark II. While a two-door hardtop would be offered as the debut vehicle, the model range would expand to a retractable-hardtop convertible and a four-door hardtop sedan.

While the original Continental coupe sold relatively poorly in contrast to its convertible counterpart, the Special Products Division had set out to introduce a full range of body styles in contrast to the Cadillac Eldorado and Packard Caribbean.

Model overview
Intended as a successor to the Lincoln Continental, effectively making its predecessor a Mark I, the Continental Mark II made its world debut at the Paris Motor Show in October 1955, a year and eight months after the introduction of the smaller two-passenger Ford Thunderbird personal luxury car (roadster). The Mark II debuted in the United States at Ford Motor Company headquarters in Dearborn, Michigan. With a $9,966 base price ($ in  dollars ), the Mark II was the most expensive domestic-produced automobile sold in the United States at the time. The only extra cost option offered for the Mark II was a $595 ($ today) air conditioner.  Despite its high price, Ford Motor Company estimated it lost nearly $1,000 ($ today) for every unit produced.

Chassis 

The rear-wheel-drive Continental Mark II is constructed using a body-on-frame chassis layout. To lower its body and to optimize the use of dual exhausts, the Mark II uses a "Y" shaped frame designed for the model line. A fully boxed crossmember was placed under the front seats, with six tube-style crossmembers located through the rest of the chassis.

While the suspension layout itself was largely adapted from the Lincoln model line, to improve the handling and ride of the 5,000 pound vehicle, the Mark II introduced speed-sensitive shock absorbers for the front wheels.

To streamline production, powertrain components were adapted from the Lincoln model line and checked through the division's quality-control program during production. The 368 cubic-inch Lincoln Y-block V8 powered the Mark II, paired with the 3-speed Turbo-Drive automatic transmission. For 1956, the engines produced 285 hp, increased to 300 hp for 1957. In a 1956 report from Popular Mechanics, the Mark ll produced 16.7 mpg at 50 mph.

Body 
While Continental was planned as a three-model range, the Mark II two-door hardtop coupe was the sole model to reach production. Sharing its 126-wheelbase with the Lincoln model line, the Mark II was over four inches shorter, two inches narrower, and over three inches lower than the Lincoln Premiere and Capri. In an extensive contrast to other American luxury cars, the body of the Mark II was conservatively styled, with chrome limited to the bumpers, grille, rocker panels, and window trim. Few curves were added to the body, with the exception of a body accent line on the fenders and doors.

In a notable departure from both American and European styling precedents, neither tailfins nor pontoon fenders were seen; a swing-away left taillamp hid the fuel cap from view. To update the Continental tire styling feature, Ford engineers moved the vertical tire inside the trunk; as the spare tire was still vertically mounted, the "tire bulge" design was introduced in order to allow for the trunklid to close.

While Continental was intended largely as a luxury vehicle, interior elements of the Mark II were intended to make the vehicle more personal than a typical American luxury vehicle. Central to the interior design was the wraparound windshield (mounted 8 inches further rearward than in a Lincoln). In contrast to Lincoln and Mercury vehicles of the time, the Continental Mark II was given a vertically angled steering wheel (with a full set of gauges grouped behind the steering wheel).

The Continental Mark II would have an extensive list of standard equipment for the time, equipped with power steering, power brakes, power windows, power seats, power vent windows, and full instrumentation, including a tachometer and a low-level fuel warning. In total, the Mark II was offered with nineteen standard exterior colors and 43 interior design schemes (with five interior fabrics). In a break from other luxury products offered by competitors, two-tone paint combinations were not available, while privately the customer could be accommodated if the appearance was desired.

Quality control 

In place of style or outright performance, to justify its exclusive price, Ford Motor Company sought to market the Continental model line as the highest-quality American automobile; in line with the coachbuilt cars of the 1930s, the Mark II was largely hand-built. While sharing its design with the standard Lincoln model line, each Continental Mark II engine was effectively factory-blueprinted; after selection from the Lincoln assembly line, the engine was disassembled and reassembled after numerous quality-control and performance inspections. Each of the four wheel covers was hand-assembled with individually fastened vanes; each letter of "Continental" was individually bolted onto the trunklid.

As American leather was sprayed vs vat dyed, Bridge of Weir leather (imported from Scotland) was used throughout the interior; as Continental felt the results were better-wearing, the leather used the Vat dye process and was dyed in the United States. While metallic-style exterior paints had become popular on 1950s American luxury cars, durability concerns forced Continental to adapt lacquer-based paint colors (the first Ford Motor Company vehicle to do so).

During the development of the Continental division by Ford Special Products, Ford Motor Company sought to develop the most stringent quality control programs ever seen in the American automotive industry, coming up with seven major initiatives for Continental. The quality control program included all employees at the assembly facility, from assembly workers to upper management. In one instance, a transporter truck of Mark IIs was returned to the factory as a gate security guard noticed a paint defect on one vehicle.

Branding 

Developed as the successor to the first-generation Lincoln Continental, the branding of the Continental Mark II has been a source of confusion. Continental Division of Ford Motor Company was a stand-alone division, with its own manufacturing facility; in July 1956, Ford closed the division, integrating Continental into Lincoln. In place of establishing a separate dealer network for Continental, the Mark II was marketed and serviced through the Lincoln-Mercury network (as Continentals shared mechanical commonality with Lincolns).

Post Mark II
For 1958, the Continental branding underwent further confusion, as the stand-alone Mark II was replaced by the Mark III. In a mandate to reduce its price to $6,000, Continental vehicles differed from Lincolns in roofline only, shifting from hand assembly to a shared assembly line. After 1959, the stand-alone Continental brand was withdrawn completely, though Lincoln continued the "Mark" nomenclature through its model cycle. The 1960 Mark V was marketed in advertising and brochures as the Lincoln Continental Mark V.

For 1961, the Lincoln brand was condensed solely to the Continental nameplate; with the exception of the 1977 Lincoln Versailles compact sedan, the practice lasted for 20 years, until full-size Lincolns were renamed the Town Car.

1969 Mark III
In 1968, Ford Motor Company introduced the 1969 Continental Mark III, entering Lincoln in the personal luxury car segment popularized by the 1958 Ford Thunderbird. The 1969 car shared platform, glass, and wheelbase with the Ford Thunderbird (fifth generation).

While far less expensive than the Mark II, the 1969 Mark III adopted a similar configuration, reviving the spare-tire trunklid. Downplaying the production of the 1958–1960 Continentals, the Mark III was intended as the revival of the Continental Mark II.

Rivalry with Eldorado
In 1957, Cadillac introduced the Cadillac Eldorado Brougham. This four-door hardtop cost US$13,074 ($ in  dollars ), more than the Mark II and the Rolls-Royce Silver Cloud. It featured a stainless steel roof and self leveling air suspension.

Following the 1957 Cadillac Eldorado Brougham and 1967 Cadillac Eldorado, General Motors and Ford Motor Company established a brand rivalry between their flagship company vehicles, lasting until the 1998 withdrawal of the Lincoln Mark VIII.

End of 'Continental'
For 1986, the Mark series was integrated into the Lincoln brand after being within the Continental sub-marque for 18 years, ending the naming confusion. The Continental Mark VII was renamed the Lincoln Mark VII and given Lincoln badging.

Production and sales
The Continental Mark II was produced at the Allen Park Body & Assembly facility in Allen Park, Michigan. Established as the headquarters and assembly plant for Continental, in a major break from Ford tradition, a moving assembly line was largely dispensed with to facilitate hand-built construction and inspection. In the factory, each vehicle was assembled on a mobile carrier; as each segment of assembly and inspection was completed, vehicles were moved by hand to different assembly stations. Following the 1957 withdrawal of the Mark II, the facility was repurposed, becoming the headquarters of Edsel. Today, the facility is used as the Ford Vehicle Operations General Office and New Model Programs Development Center, used to develop new vehicles and their manufacturing.

In total, 3,005 Continental Mark IIs were produced. This number includes three prototypes and 13 pre-production vehicles. Serial numbers for Mark IIs ran from 975 to 3989; numbers 986 to 998 were unused. The first regular production car was number 1001. The three prototype cars were numbered  500, 501, and 502F. The first two were scrapped in June 1956, and the third car survives today.

While a convertible never reached production, two 1956 Mark IIs were converted to convertibles on an official basis. One was converted by Hess & Eisenhardt (no. 1126), while another was converted by Derham Body Company (no. 3190). The latter car was given to the wife of William Clay Ford as a personal vehicle; initially painted white, it was later painted sky blue.

Many Mark IIs were purchased new by wealthy and prominent figures. These included Barry Goldwater (no. 2804), Dwight Eisenhower (no. 3411), Frank Sinatra (no. 1884), and Liz Taylor (no. 3196).

Appearances in media 

The Continental Mark II was featured in the 1956 film High Society, starring Frank Sinatra, Bing Crosby, Grace Kelly, and Louis Armstrong.

A Continental Mark II was used in the Perry Mason TV series Season 1, Episode 9: "The Case of the Vagabond Vixen" which aired on November 16, 1957.

After its sale to George Barris, the 1955 Lincoln Futura concept car (which used a Mark II chassis and powertrain) was converted to become the Batmobile for the namesake 1960s TV series.

Legacy 
While the Mark II two-door hardtop was the exclusive model line produced by Continental, several elements of the Mark II would live on in other Ford Motor Company vehicles. While the Continental retractable hardtop never saw production, the top mechanism would be utilized in the 1957–1959 Ford Skyliner; the mechanism also would see use by the 1961–1967 Lincoln Continental and the 1958-1966 Ford Thunderbird.

As part of the Lincoln brand history, the Continental Mark II is the beginning of the Mark series (with two successors in its model history), introducing the integrated "Continental tire". The four-point star emblem of Lincoln debuted on the Mark II and has remained in use on Lincoln vehicles since 1958.

Today, approximately half of the original circa 3,000 cars still exist in various states of repair; an active Mark II Forum exists Prices range between $25,000 for a running example in poor repair to $240,000 in concours condition.

See also
 Lincoln Mark series

References

Continental Mark 2
Cars introduced in 1956
Personal luxury cars
Ford Motor Company Marques